The Penghu Reclamation Hall is a museum in Magong Township, Penghu County, Taiwan, dedicated to the history of settlement in Penghu Islands.

History
The museum building was originally constructed in 1935 as the official residence of the Hōko Prefecture governor. After the handover of Taiwan from Japan to the Republic of China in 1945, the building became the official residence of the Penghu County magistrate. In 1992, the building ceased to be used as an official residence. In 2000, renovation to transform the residence into a museum started. Upon completion, the hall was officially opened in July, 2003.

Architecture
The building was constructed in a mixture of western and Japanese architectural style. It has European style octagonal windows, wooden doors, Japanese sliding doors and Japanese roofs. It also features a garden with old Banyan trees. It contains several exhibition areas: “The Prelude of Penghu Exploration” , “Immigrants from Faraway”, “Settlements in Penghu”, “ War and Battles at Penghu”, “The Political and Economic Infrastructure of Penghu”.

See also
 List of tourist attractions in Taiwan

References

External links

 

1935 establishments in Taiwan
Buildings and structures in Penghu County
Houses completed in 1935
Tourist attractions in Penghu County